Eddie Lee Ivery (born July 30, 1957) is a former professional American football player.

Early years through college
Ivery was born in McDuffie County, Georgia. He played high school football at Thomson High School in Thomson, Georgia.  During the 1974 season he rushed for 1,710 yards.
He played college football for the Georgia Tech Yellow Jackets football team (1975–1978), and was an AP and UPI All-American in his senior season of 1978. Ivery was inducted into the Georgia Tech Athletic Hall of Fame in 1983. He finished 8th in the 1978 Heisman Trophy voting with 11 first place votes, 19 second place votes, 10 third place votes and 81 votes total.

College statistics

* Includes bowl games.

College records and honors
NCAA single game highest average gain per rush-(Min. 26 rushes) - 13.7 vs. Air Force, Nov. 11, 1978
Division One single game rushing record- 356 yards vs. Air Force, Nov. 11, 1978
Georgia Tech Football single season rushing yards leader- 1,562 yards
Georgia Tech 3rd in career (1975–78) rushing yards- 3,517 in 609 attempts and 22 TD.
Georgia Tech 4th in career all-purpose yards- 4,324
Georgia Tech Athletics Hall of Fame (1983)

Professional career
Ivery was selected in the first round of the 1979 NFL Draft. He played for eight seasons as a running back with the Green Bay Packers. He was forced to retire after suffering a leg injury.

Life after football
Since 2000, Ivery has worked as assistant strength coach for Georgia Tech after completing a stint with the McDuffie County Board of Education and coaching at Thomson High School, where he played high school football.  He completed his degree at Georgia Tech in 1992.

References

1957 births
Living people
People from McDuffie County, Georgia
Players of American football from Georgia (U.S. state)
American football running backs
Georgia Tech Yellow Jackets football players
Green Bay Packers players
People from Thomson, Georgia